Lake Edward is a lake in Crow Wing County, Minnesota.

According to Warren Upham, Lake Edward was probably named for a government surveyor.

References

Lakes of Minnesota
Lakes of Crow Wing County, Minnesota